"Do Thangz" is a song by American R&B quintet Men of Vizion. It was the second single from the group's debut album Personal (1996) and was released as the "Main Pass Remix" (alternatively titled "A Dark Child remix") featuring guest vocals by Missy "Misdemeanor" Elliott and production by Rodney "Darkchild" Jerkins, who coincidentally produced Elliott's breakout featured single, "The Things You Do (Remix)", three months prior.

The single was executive produced by the group's mentor, Michael Jackson; additionally, the remix is noted for its sampling of MC Shan's "The Bridge".

Music video
A music video for the remixed single was directed by Lionel C. Martin and premiered on BET in early October 1996. It opens with Missy Elliott performing her rap while doing her infamous slide-dance move on a pavement outside of a barbershop. The scene then intercuts with Men of Vizion performing their vocals while walking down a street and dancing with Missy.

Track listings
12"/CD single
 "Do Thangz" (Main Pass Remix) (featuring Missy "Misdemeanor" Elliott) — 4:36
 "Do Thangz" (Main Pass W/O Rap) — 4:32   
 "Do Thangz" (LP Version) (featuring Nutta Butta) — 5:01   
 "Do Thangz" (Instrumental Remix) — 4:29   
 "Do Thangz" (Beat Mix) — 4:36   
 "Do Thangz" (Acappella) — 4:32

Charts
In late October 1996, the song debuted on Billboard R&B Singles at #63 and would later peak at #53 the following week.

References

1996 songs
1996 singles
Men of Vizion songs
Missy Elliott songs
Song recordings produced by Rodney Jerkins
Song recordings produced by Teddy Riley
Songs written by Missy Elliott
Songs written by Teddy Riley